A Young Person's Guide to King Crimson is a 2-LP compilation album by the band King Crimson, released in 1976. At the time the band had split. The track selection was by Robert Fripp.

Its name is most likely derived either from the famous orchestral work The Young Person's Guide to the Orchestra from composer Benjamin Britten or the 1960s television series Young Person's Guide to the Orchestra, created by conductor/composer Leonard Bernstein.

The gatefold-sleeve featured, as the front (The Landscape Player) and back cover (Earth), artwork by Scottish artist Fergus Hall. Included as part of the package was a booklet, replete with photographs, and detailing gig history and notable events: this was compiled by Robert Fripp from his own archive.

To date, its sole CD release has been in Japan, in 1990. This 2-CD set, which faithfully duplicated the vinyl running-order, included a reproduction of the booklet, scaled-down. Playing times are approximately 40 minutes long for CD1, and 35 minutes for CD2.

Track listing

LP 1

Side one

Side two

LP 2

Side one

Side two

Notes

References

1976 compilation albums
King Crimson compilation albums
E.G. Records compilation albums
Island Records compilation albums